Reko Diq is a small town in Chagai District, Balochistan, Pakistan. It is located in a desert area, 70 kilometres north-west of Naukundi, close to Pakistan's border with Iran and Afghanistan. The area is located in Tethyan belt that stretches all the way from Turkey and Iran into Pakistan.

Reko Diq is a remote location in the North-West of Chagai district. Chagai is a sparsely populated western desert district of Balochistan. It is mostly low relief and thinly populated desert. The weather of Chagai ranges from very hot summers of 40-50 °C to very cool winters of up to -10 °C with less than 40 mm precipitation (winter rain and minor snow). It also exhibits periods of high wind and dust/sand storms which have a demobilizing impact on the local activities and trade. Access to the Chagai district is via the Zahidan - Quetta highway also known as the London Road.

According to the 1998 census the population of Chagai District was 202,562, along with approximately 53,000 Afghan refugees. The population of Chagai District was estimated to be over 250,000 in 2005. Over 50% of the people of the area are Muslims. According to Dr. Samar Mubarakmand (Member Science & Technology, Planning Commission of Pakistan)  Geological Survey of Pakistan had discovered the Reko Diq reserves way back in 1978.

Reko Diq, which means sandy peak in Baluchi language, is also the name of an ancient volcano.

Reko Diq Mine is famous because of its vast Gold and Copper Reserves and its believed to have the world 5th largest gold deposit.

See also 
 Reko Diq Mine

References

External links
Tethyan Copper Company Pakistan (Pvt.) Ltd
Barrick Reko Diq Projects
http://www.hrw.org/news/2011/02/01/papua-new-guinea-serious-abuses-barrick-gold-mine

Populated places in Chagai District
Mining communities in Pakistan